Yatagan was one of four s built for the French Navy around the beginning of the 20th century. During the First World War, she was sunk after a collision with a British cargo ship in 1916.

Design and description
They displaced  at deep load. Their complement consisted of four officers and forty-four enlisted men.

The Framée-class ships were armed with a single  gun forward of the bridge and six  Hotchkiss guns, three on each broadside. They were fitted with two single  torpedo tubes, one between the funnels and the other on the stern. Two reload torpedoes were also carried.

Construction and career
Yatagan was ordered from Ateliers et Chantiers de la Loire and the ship was laid down in 1897 at its shipyard in Nantes. The ship was launched on 20 July 1800. The ship served on fishery protection duties during the war. While thus engaged, she collided with the British steamer Teviot and sank in the English Channel off Dieppe, France, on 3 November 1916.

References

Bibliography

 

Framée-class destroyers
Ships built in France
1900 ships
Maritime incidents in 1916
Ships sunk in collisions
World War I shipwrecks in the English Channel